Hemionitis is a genus of ferns in the subfamily Cheilanthoideae of the family Pteridaceae. Its circumscription varies greatly in different systems of fern classification. In the Pteridophyte Phylogeny Group classification of 2016 (PPG I), it was one of more than 20 genera in the subfamily Cheilanthoideae, and was said to have five species. Other sources treat it as the only genus in the subfamily, and so accept about 450 species. With the restricted circumscription, species are native to tropical America.

Taxonomy

The genus Hemionitis was first described by Carl Linnaeus in 1753. The genus name is pre-Linnaean, being used for example in the Hortus Cliffortianus, and derives from the Greek word , meaning 'mule', referring to the belief that the plants were sterile. (Linnaeus used the same word in the name "Asplenium hemionitis".)

The division of the subfamily Cheilanthoideae into genera varies greatly between sources . Christenhusz et al. (2011), the Pteridophyte Phylogeny Group classification of 2016 (PPG I), and the Checklist of Ferns and Lycophytes of the World divide the subfamily into 20 or more genera, of which one is Hemionitis sensu stricto. On the other hand, Christenhusz et al. (2018) and Plants of the World Online use Hemionitis sensu lato as a catch-all genus for the subfamily, resulting in about 450 species.

Species
Using the PPG I approach, the Checklist of Ferns and Lycophytes of the World accepted the following species (and one hybrid) in Hemionitis sensu stricto. All are native to tropical America.
Hemionitis levyi E.Fourn.
Hemionitis palmata L.
Hemionitis pinnatifida Baker
Hemionitis rufa (L.) Sw.
Hemionitis tomentosa (Lam.) Raddi
Hemionitis umbrosa R.Y.Hirai & J.Prado
Hemionitis × smithii (Trevis.) C.Chr. = H. palmata × H. rufa

References

Pteridaceae
Fern genera